Dale Michael Tempest (born 30 December 1963) is a former professional footballer, Born in England, he played for several English teams including Fulham, Huddersfield Town, Gillingham and Colchester United before arriving in Hong Kong in 1989 where he played for four clubs in nine years. He also represented the Hong Kong national team at international level, making six appearances and scoring two goals between 1996 and 1998.

Career

Early years
Tempest was born in Leeds. He went to school in Bracknell, Berkshire at Garth Hill Comprehensive, leaving in 1980 to sign for Fulham.

Career in Hong Kong
Tempest arrived in Hong Kong in 1989 and played for South China. He moved to Eastern but later returned to South China. He was the top scorer in the Hong Kong First Division League on a record five occasions (1989–90, 1990–91, 1992–93, 1993–94, 1994–95). Probably his most memorable match among Hong Kong football fans came in a friendly between South China and São Paulo FC, when Tempest scored three goals and helped South China win 4–2. In 1997, having granted permanent resident status by the Hong Kong Government, he represented Hong Kong at international level and played in the 1998 Fifa World Cup qualifiers against South Korea and Thailand. He also scored a goal against Japan during the 1998 Dynasty Cup.

Recent years
Tempest now works as a betting expert for Sky Sports in the UK.

References

1963 births
Living people
Footballers from Leeds
Hong Kong footballers
Hong Kong international footballers
English footballers
English emigrants to Hong Kong
English expatriate footballers
Association football forwards
English Football League players
Belgian Pro League players
Fulham F.C. players
K.S.C. Lokeren Oost-Vlaanderen players
Huddersfield Town A.F.C. players
Gillingham F.C. players
Colchester United F.C. players
Eastern Sports Club footballers
South China AA players
Hong Kong First Division League players
Hong Kong people of English descent
Expatriate footballers in Belgium
Naturalized footballers of Hong Kong